Boon may refer to:

Arts, entertainment, and media
 Boon (game), a trick-taking card game
 Boon (novel), a 1915 satirical work by H. G. Wells
 Boon (TV series), a British television series starring Michael Elphick
 The Ultimate Boon, a stage in Joseph Campbell's hero's journey or monomyth

People

Surname
 Boon (surname), a list of people with the surname Boon

Given name
 Boon Gould (1955–2019), English lead guitarist of Level 42
 Boon Mark Gittisarn (1898–1987), Thai Protestant pastor
 Boon Thau Loo, Singaporean-American computer scientist
 Lim Boon Keng (1869–1957), Chinese doctor, social and educational reformer in China and Singapore

Fictional
 Marukubi Boon, an Osamu Tezuka stock character

Places

North America
 Boon, Michigan, United States
 Boon Township, Michigan
 Boon, Ontario, Canada
 Boon Island, Maine, United States
 Boon Point, Saint John, Antigua and Barbuda
 Boon Township, Indiana, United States
 Boon Lake Township, Minnesota, United States
 Boones Mill, Virginia, United States (originally known as Boon Mill)

Other
 Boon, Awdal, Somaliland
 Boon (Pontus), Turkey, a town of ancient Pontus
 Boon Farm, Scotland, United Kingdom

Other uses
 Boon Brewery, a Belgian brewery
 Boon language, a nearly extinct East Cushitic language
 Daihatsu Boon, a Japanese subcompact hatchback

See also
 Boone (disambiguation)